Axel Axelsson (born 1942) is an Icelandic former footballer who played as a forward. He won three caps for the Iceland national football team between 1963 and 1964.

References

Axel Axelsson international appearances at ksi.is

1942 births
Living people
Axel Axelsson
Association football forwards
Axel Axelsson